Salampasu (Luntu) is a Bantu language of the Democratic Republic of the Congo.

Maho (2009) considers the Luntu variety to be a distinct language.

References

Lunda languages
Languages of the Democratic Republic of the Congo